Børge Hansen (born 6 January 1931) is a Danish former rower. He competed in two events at the 1956 Summer Olympics.

References

External links
 

1931 births
Possibly living people
Danish male rowers
Olympic rowers of Denmark
Rowers at the 1956 Summer Olympics
Rowers from Copenhagen